Persimmon Branch is a stream in Wayne County in the U.S. state of Missouri. It is a tributary of Big Lake Creek.

Persimmon Branch was so named on account of persimmon timber near its course.

See also
List of rivers of Missouri

References

Rivers of Wayne County, Missouri
Rivers of Missouri